Alessandro Altobelli (born 28 November 1955) is a former professional Italian footballer who played as a forward, and who won the 1982 World Cup with Italy. Nicknamed Spillo ("Needle") for his slender build, Altobelli was a prolific goalscorer, and he became one of the greatest and most effective Italian strikers of the late 1970s and 1980s. Altobelli is currently the all-time top scorer in the Coppa Italia, with 56 goals in 93 appearances, and the ninth-highest scoring Italian player in all competitions, with almost 300 career goals.

Club career
Altobelli was born in Sonnino, Latina. Following spells at Latina (Serie C) and Brescia (Serie B), he was signed by Serie A club Internazionale in 1977, for whom he played 466 times, scoring 209 goals (128 in Serie A). He contributed heavily to his team's scudetto victory of 1980 (scoring 15 goals), and also helped Inter to win two Coppa Italia titles in 1978 and 1982, finishing as the tournament's top scorer in the 1982 edition, with nine goals. Altobelli was also the top scorer in the 1978–79 European Cup Winners' Cup, with seven goals, leading Inter to the quarter-finals of the tournament. After his lengthy period with Inter, he played one season with Juventus during the 1988–89 season, before ending his career with Brescia in Serie B once again, during the 1989–90 season.

International career
For Italy, Altobelli was capped 61 times between 1980 and 1988, scoring 25 goals, and he is currently Italy's sixth highest goalscorer. His most notable international goal was Italy's third goal in the 1982 FIFA World Cup final, which Italy won 3–1 over West Germany. After coming on in the seventh minute of play for the injured Francesco Graziani, he became the second ever substitute to score in a FIFA World Cup final (after Dick Nanninga in 1978 and with Rudi Völler and Mario Götze repeating this, in 1986 and in 2014, respectively). Altobelli also played at Euro 80, with Italy finishing in fourth place on home soil, as well as representing Italy at the 1986 FIFA World Cup, scoring four goals, which were, however, not enough to prevent the defending champions from crashing out of the tournament in the round of 16. He also represented Italy at Euro 88, where he played as the team's captain, leading the Italian squad to the semi-finals once again. He made four substitute appearances scoring just after coming on in a 2–0 win over Denmark in the group stages.

Style of play
Altobelli was a highly prolific goalscorer, who was regarded as a complete, world class striker. A well rounded centre-forward, with an eye for goal, he excelled in the air due to his heading accuracy, power, elevation, agility and acrobatic ability; he was also a fast, hard-working, and opportunistic player, with excellent technique, and he possessed an accurate shot with either foot, in spite of being naturally left-footed. Despite his slender build, he had excellent balance and deceptive strength. Moreover, he was capable of protecting the ball with his back to goal, and holding it up for his teammates.

After retirement
After retirement, he played for Italy national beach soccer team, being the top scorer at the 1995 and 1996 Beach Soccer World Championships.

In the 1990s, he entered politics. He also worked as a sporting director for Padova and as a football scout for Inter.

In the 2000s, he served as a pundit for Al Jazeera. Since September 2020, he serves as pundit for RAI TV show A tutto campo. He also featured as a pundit in 90º minuto.

Career statistics

Club

International 

Scores and results list Italy's goal tally first, score column indicates score after each Altobelli goal.

Honours
Inter Milan
Serie A: 1979–80
Coppa Italia: 1977–78, 1981–82

Italy
FIFA World Cup: 1982

Individual
European Cup Winners' Cup top goalscorer: 1978–79
Coppa Italia top goal scorer: 1981–82
FIFA Beach Soccer World Cup top goalscorer: 1995, 1996

References

External links

Official website 
Alessandro Altobelli at Treccani 

Italian footballers
Italy international footballers
Italy under-21 international footballers
Association football forwards
Serie A players
Serie B players
Serie C players
Brescia Calcio players
Inter Milan players
Juventus F.C. players
FIFA World Cup-winning players
1982 FIFA World Cup players
1986 FIFA World Cup players
UEFA Euro 1980 players
UEFA Euro 1988 players
Italian beach soccer players
Sportspeople from the Province of Latina
1955 births
Living people
Footballers from Lazio
People from Sonnino